3rd Duke of Buckingham  may refer to:

 Edward Stafford, 3rd Duke of Buckingham (1478–1521), English nobleman
 Richard Temple-Grenville, 3rd Duke of Buckingham and Chandos (1823–1889), British soldier